Michael G. Summers (born November 19, 1972) is a former State Delegate for District 47 in Prince George's County, Maryland, elected in 2010 and then defeated during the 2014 Democratic Primary.

Education
Summers graduated from Eastern Guilford High School in Gibsonville, North Carolina. He received his B.A. (history) from North Carolina Agricultural and Technical State University in 1997.

Career

In the legislature
Serving in Prince George's County delegation from January 12, 2011, to January 14, 2015, Summers was a member of Legislative Black Caucus of Maryland, the Green Caucus and the Ways and Means Committee.

Past elections
2010 Race for Maryland House of Delegates – 47th District
Voters to choose three:
{|class="wikitable"
|-
!Name
!Votes
!Percent
!Outcome
|-
|- 
|Jolene Ivey, Democratic
|14,404
|  35.4%
|   Won
|-
|- 
|Michael G. Summers, Democratic
|12,337
|  30.3%
|   Won
|-
|- 
|Doyle L. Niemann, Democratic
|11,925
|  29.3%
|   Won
|-
|- 
|Rachel Audi, Republican
|1,853
|  4.6%
|   
|-
|- 
|Anthony Cicoria, Democratic (Write in)
|63
|  0.2%
|   
|-
|Other write-ins
|87
|  0.2%
|   
|-
|}

2014 Race for Maryland House of Delegates – 47A District (Democratic Primary)
Voters to choose two:
{|class="wikitable"
|-
!Name
!Votes
!Percent
!Outcome
|-
|- 
|Jimmy Tarlau, Democratic
|2,728
|  26.7%
|   Won
|-
|- 
|Diana Fennell, Democratic
|2,416
|  23.7%
|   Won
|-
|- 
|Michael Summers (Incumbent), Democratic
|1,740
|  17.1%
|   
|-
|- 
|Malcolm Augustine, Democratic
|1,688
|  16.6%
|   
|-
|- 
|Joseph Solomon, Democratic
|1,627
|  16%
|   
|-
|}

References

1972 births
Living people
Democratic Party members of the Maryland House of Delegates
North Carolina A&T State University alumni
People from Cheverly, Maryland
21st-century American politicians